Enrico Ferri (25 February 1856 – 12 April 1929) was an Italian criminologist, socialist and student of Cesare Lombroso, the founder of the Italian school of criminology. While Lombroso researched the purported physiological factors that motivated criminals, Ferri investigated social and economic aspects. He served as editor of the socialist daily Avanti! and, in 1884, saw his book Criminal Sociology published. Later, his work served as the basis for Argentina’s penal code of 1921. Although at first he rejected the Italian dictator Benito Mussolini, Ferri later became one of Mussolini and his National Fascist Party's main external supporters.

Biography
Ferri was born in Lombardy in 1856, and worked first as a lecturer and later as a professor of Criminal law, having spent time as a student of Cesare Lombroso. While Lombroso researched anthropological criminology, Ferri focused more on social and economic influences on the criminal and crime rates.

Ferri's research led to him postulating theories calling for crime prevention methods to be the mainstay of law enforcement, as opposed to punishment of criminals after their crimes had taken place. He became a founder of the positivist school, and he researched psychological and social positivism as opposed to the biological positivism of Lombroso.

Ferri, at the time a radical, was elected to Italian Parliament in 1886. In 1893, he joined the Italian Socialist Party and edited their daily newspaper, the Avanti. In 1900 and 1904 he spoke out in Congress against the roles of socialist ministers in bourgeoisie governments.

Ferri favoured Italian neutrality during World War I, and he was re-elected as a Socialist Party deputy in 1921. In post-war Italy, he became a supporter of Mussolini's Fascist regime. Ferri died in 1929.

Ferri is mentioned several times by Scipio Sighele as a contemporary colleague and friend in Sighele’s early book “The Criminal Crowd” about mass psychology. Both sociologists shared more or less the same view about the influence of a crowd on the members of that crowd. This fundamental idea was also described by Gabriel Tarde and Gustave le Bon.

Literary works
 Studi dalla criminalità in Francia dal 1826 al 1878, 1881.
 Socialismo e criminalità, 1883.
 Sociologia criminale, 1884.
 
 Socialismo e scienza positiva, 1894.

 I socialisti nazionali e il governo fascista, 1923.
 Il Fascismo in Italia e l'opera di Benito Mussolini, 1928.

Criminology theories

Ferri disputed Lombroso's emphasis on biological characteristics of criminals; instead, he focused on the study of psychological characteristics, which he believed accounted for the development of crime in an individual. These characteristics included slang, handwriting, secret symbols, literature, and art, as well as moral insensibility and "a lack of repugnance to the idea and execution of the offence, previous to its commission, and the absence of remorse after committing it".

Ferri argued that sentiments such as religion, love, honour, and loyalty did not contribute to criminal behaviour, as these ideas were too complicated to have a definite impact on a person's basic moral sense, from which Ferri believed criminal behaviour stemmed. Ferri argued that other sentiments, such as hate, cupidity, and vanity had greater influences as they held more control over a person's moral sense.

Ferri summarized his theory by defining criminal psychology as a "defective resistance to criminal tendencies and temptations, due to that ill-balanced impulsiveness which characterises children and savages".

Political beliefs
Ferri often drew comparisons between socialism and Darwinism, and disputed particular works by Ernst Haeckel that highlighted contradictions between the two schools of thought. Ferri instead argued that Darwinism provided socialism its key scientific principles.

Ferri viewed religion and science as inversely proportional; thus as one rose in strength, the other declined. Ferri observed that as Darwinism dealt a damaging blow to religion and the origins of the universe according to the church, so socialism rose in comparison. Thus, Ferri argued that socialism was an extension of Darwinism and the theory of evolution.

At the end of his life, he became one of the main supporters of Benito Mussolini. He started to consider fascism as an expression of socialist ideals, that fascism was the "affirmation of the state against liberal individualism".

Notes and references

External links 
 Enrico Ferri Archive at marxists.org
 
 
 

1856 births
1929 deaths
Italian criminologists
Italian socialists
Italian fascists
Positive criminology